Nicolas Bergier, lawyer at the Presidial Seat of Rheims,  lived in 17th-century Rheims and became interested in Roman roads there. Mentioning by chance his interest in the funding of Roman roads to Conde du Lis, advisor to Louis XIII, he found himself suddenly commanded by the king to undertake a study of all Roman roads. Five years later he published his Histoire des Grands Chemins de l'Empire Romain, a two-volume work of over 1000 pages. There were many subsequent editions. This first scholarly study of Roman roads included engravings of the Tabula Peutingeriana. Edward Gibbon consulted Bergier's work while researching his Decline and Fall of the Roman Empire.

Biography 
Historian, lawyer, Nicolas Bergier taught at the Collège des Bons-Enfants and at the Faculty of Law of the University of Rheims. Friend with Jacques Dupuy and Nicolas-Claude Fabri de Peiresc, he was appointed, thanks to another friend the president De Bellièvre, historiographer of France, with a  pension of two hundred ecus.

He worked with Charles du Lys, lawyer, and Nicolas Brulart de Sillery, Chancellor of France.

References

 Portrait

External links
 Article on Nicolas Bergier in A Universal Biography by John Platts (1826).

17th-century French historians
17th-century French lawyers
French scholars of Roman history
Writers from Reims
Year of birth missing
Year of death missing